Charikleia Bouda (born 17 August 1980), also transliterated as Haríklia or Kharikleia, is a Greek sprinter. She competed in the women's 4 × 400 metres relay at the 2004 Summer Olympics, along with Hrisoula Goudenoudi, Dimitra Dova, and Fani Halkia.

References

External links
 

1980 births
Living people
Athletes (track and field) at the 2004 Summer Olympics
Greek female sprinters
Olympic athletes of Greece
Place of birth missing (living people)
Sportspeople from Drama, Greece